Hart's War is a 1999 novel by John Katzenbach. It is about POWs in World War II. The movie of the same name, starring Bruce Willis, was released in 2002. The film also starred Colin Farrell playing Lieutenant Thomas Hart.

References

External links
 "Hart's War" on Google Books
 Hart's War (book synopsis) at The Mystery Reader

1999 American novels
Novels set during World War II
Novels about prisoners of war